Mr. Stein Goes Online is a 2017 French comedy film directed by Stéphane Robelin.

Cast 
 Pierre Richard - Pierre Stein
 Yaniss Lespert - Alex
 Fanny Valette - Flora
  - Sylvie
  - Juliette
 Gustave Kervern - Bernard
 Macha Méril - Marie
 Anna Bederke - Madeleine

Reception
On review aggregator Rotten Tomatoes, the film holds an approval rating of 44%, based on 9 reviews with an average rating of 5.2/10.

References

External links 

2017 comedy films
French comedy films
2010s French films